Fremont Correctional Facility (FCF) is a state prison located in the East Canon prison complex in Fremont County, just east of Canon City, Colorado. 

FCF offers treatment programs for special inmate populations such as sex offenders and drug abusers.  Approximately 85% of the inmates housed at FCF have been convicted of sexual offenses. FCF is one of the few state prisons in Colorado to offer a sex offender treatment program.

Other prisons in the East Cañon Complex include the Arrowhead Correctional Center, the Centennial Correctional Facility, Four Mile Correctional Center, the Colorado State Penitentiary, and Skyline Correctional Center, all nearby in unincorporated Fremont County.

References 

Prisons in Colorado
Buildings and structures in Fremont County, Colorado
1962 establishments in Colorado